Sir John Maclean KB, FSA (17 September 1811 – 5 March 1895) was a British civil servant, genealogist and author.

Life
Maclean was born John Lean, a son of Robert Lean, of Trehudreth in the parish of Blisland in Cornwall, where he was born in 1811. His mother was Elizabeth Every, a daughter of Thomas Every, of Bodmin, Cornwall. After genealogical research his ancestors were connected to the Scottish Clan Maclean, and in 1845, with his brothers, he added to his surname the prefix "Mac".

In 1837 he entered the Ordnance Department of the War Office, and became deputy auditor in April, 1865.
He resigned this post on a pension, and received a knighthood in January, 1871. Sir John Maclean died at his residence, Glasbury House, Richmond Hill, Clifton, Bristol, of influenza. on Tuesday 5 March 1895.

Family
In 1835 at Helland in Cornwall, he married Mary Billing, eldest sister and co-heiress of Thomas Billing, of Lanke, Cornwall.

Writings

Sir John's Parochial History of the Deanery of Trigg Minor (1872–1879) in 3 volumes is the most detailed work of parochial history which deals with Cornwall (the deanery of Trigg Minor consisted of 20 parishes at the time he wrote). It was published in parts intended for binding as three volumes: there was also a separate edition of the part on Blisland. He was the author of several other historical works, including Life and Times of Sir Peter Carew, Letters of Sir Robert Cecil to Sir George Carew, and Memoir of the Family of Poyntz, (of Iron Acton, Gloucestershire).

List of works
Historical and genealogical memoir of the family of Poyntz : or, eight centuries of an English house (Volume pt.1)
Historical and genealogical memoir of the family of Poyntz : or, eight centuries of an English house (Volume pt.2)
Parochial History of the Deanery of Trigg Minor, 1874
Parochial History of the Deanery of Trigg Minor, Vol.2, 1876
Sir John Maclean Parochial and Family History of the Parish of St Menefreda alias St Minfre alias St Minver in the County of Cornwall; 1876
Heraldic Visitation of Gloucestershire:

References

1811 births
1895 deaths
19th-century English historians
Historians of Cornwall
British civil servants
English male non-fiction writers
19th-century English male writers